The Roll of the Peerage is a public record registering peers in the peerages of England, Scotland, Ireland, Great Britain and the United Kingdom. It was created by Royal Warrant of Queen Elizabeth II dated 1 June 2004, is maintained by the Crown Office within the United Kingdom's Ministry of Justice, and is published by the College of Arms.

Background 

On 11 November 1999, the House of Lords Act 1999 received royal assent and took effect, removing the automatic right of hereditary peers to a seat in the House of Lords. Until that date anyone succeeding to a title in the peerages of England, Scotland, Great Britain or the United Kingdom and proving succession received a writ of summons to Parliament. All peers receiving such writs were enrolled in the Register of Lords Spiritual and Temporal, a document maintained by the Clerk of the Parliaments.

The Register of Lords Spiritual and Temporal was not a complete roll of the peerage. Succession to a title in the Peerage of Ireland had never conferred an automatic right to a writ of summons in the United Kingdom Parliament, although from 1801 to 1922 elected representative peers from the Irish peerage did receive writs. A similar system of representation operated for peers of Scotland from 1707 to 1963, when the right to a writ of summons was extended to all peers of Scotland. However, the Register was an officially compiled roll recording a large proportion of the hereditary peerages of the United Kingdom and its constituent kingdoms.

Under the House of Lords Act 1999, the only peers receiving writs of summons to Parliament are life peers and 92 representatives of the hereditary peerages of England, Scotland, Great Britain and the United Kingdom. Seventy-five of these representatives are elected by and among the hereditary peers themselves, and fifteen are elected by the whole House from those ready to serve as Deputy Speakers or in any office that the House may require; the remaining two, the Duke of Norfolk and the Marquess of Cholmondeley, have automatic seats in virtue of their offices of state as Earl Marshal and Lord Great Chamberlain respectively. These 92 and any other hereditary peers who may wish to stand in by-elections for the 90 elected representative seats are the only hereditary peers currently recorded for parliamentary purposes. This falls considerably short of the coverage achieved by the old Register of Lords Spiritual and Temporal, and shorter still of being a full register of hereditary peers.

Royal warrant of 2004 

The royal warrant of 1 June 2004 had the express aim of remedying this situation as far as possible, stating in the preamble the desirability of a full record of the peerage. It cited as its model the creation of the Official Roll of the Baronetage, achieved by royal warrant of Edward VII on 8 February 1910, and established an analogous roll for recording peers of all five peerages recognized in the United Kingdom. The warrant was published in the London Gazette on 11 June 2004.

Maintenance and publication of the roll 
The qarrant imposed the duty of creating and maintaining the Roll on the Secretary of State for Constitutional Affairs, acting in consultation with Garter Principal King of Arms and Lord Lyon King of Arms. On the closure of the Department for Constitutional Affairs in 2007 the duty was transferred, along with the other functions of that department, to the Secretary of State for Justice. Maintenance of the roll is carried out by an official in the Crown Office known as the Registrar of the Peerage and assisted by an Assistant Registrar.

From November 2010 the most recent version of the roll has been published in pdf on the website of the College of Arms together with the text of the royal warrant, information on the creation and maintenance of the roll, and copies of guidance notes and forms for those wishing to apply to be entered on it.

Method of enrollment 

Enrollment is automatically consequent upon creation as a peer and can be applied for by way of proving succession to a peerage to the satisfaction of the Lord Chancellor and the Secretary of State for Justice. Essential items in proving succession are a formal petition and a statutory declaration made by a person other than the applicant. Guidance notes are produced by the Crown Office to assist with simple proof, as where for instance the applicant is closely related to his or her predecessor. More complex succession, where the relationship is distant, may require specific professional assistance from an officer of arms, a genealogist, a legal practitioner or the Registrar of the Peerage.

Effect of enrollment 

According to the royal warrant any person not entered on the roll shall not be entitled to the precedence of a peer or addressed or referred to as a peer in any official document. However a peer who is enrolled in a junior title (not having proved a senior title) is nonetheless noted in the roll as 'customarily styled' by the superior title in question, which is then named—even though succession to this title has not been proved. One example of many is Viscount Midleton, who appears as Lord Brodrick on the roll, the title to which he has proved succession, with the statement that he is customarily known as Viscount Midleton and a cross-reference from 'Midleton'.

References

External links 
 The Roll of the Peerage as currently published with ancillary material on the website of the College of Arms
 The text of the Royal Warrant of 1 June 2004 as published in the London Gazette
 List of peers present and absent, 25 January 1689 - Lords Journal
 List of the Peers, 1727 (before the death of George I)
 List of the Lords Temporal, 1825
 Roll of the Lords Spiritual and Temporal - Parliamentary Debates, 1829
 Roll of the Lords Spiritual and Temporal - Parliamentary Debates, 1830
 Roll of the Lords Spiritual and Temporal - Parliamentary Debates, 1832
 Roll of the Lords Spiritual and Temporal - Parliamentary Debates, 1835
 Roll of the Lords Spiritual and Temporal - Parliamentary Debates, 1837-8
 Roll of the Lords Spiritual and Temporal - Burke's Peerage, 5th edition, 1838, P 36
 Roll of the Lords Spiritual and Temporal - Burke's Peerage, 6th edition, 1839, P 1184 - Hathitrust
 Roll of the Lords Spiritual and Temporal - Burke's Peerage, 6th edition, 1839, P 1184 - Archive.org
 Roll of the Lords Spiritual and Temporal - Lodge's Peerage, 14th edition, 1845, P xlvii
 Roll of the Lords Spiritual and Temporal - Parliamentary Debates, 1847
 Roll of the Lords Spiritual and Temporal - Lodge's Peerage, 17th edition, 1848, P xlvii
 Roll of the Lords Spiritual and Temporal - Parliamentary Debates, 1849
 Roll of the Lords Spiritual and Temporal - Parliamentary Debates, 1850
 Roll of the Lords Spiritual and Temporal - Parliamentary Debates, 1851
 Roll of the Lords Spiritual and Temporal - Parliamentary Debates, 1852
 Roll of the Lords Spiritual and Temporal - Parliamentary Debates, 1854
 Roll of the Lords Spiritual and Temporal - Sessional Papers, 1856
 Roll of the Lords Spiritual and Temporal - Sessional Papers, 1857
 Roll of the Lords Spiritual and Temporal - Parliamentary Debates, 1859
 Roll of the Lords Spiritual and Temporal - Burke's Peerage, 23rd edition, 1861, P xxxv
 Roll of the Lords Spiritual and Temporal - Parliamentary Debates, 1862
 Newspaper clipping about Roll of the Lords for 1864
 Roll of the Lords Spiritual and Temporal - Burke's Peerage, 27th edition, 1865, P xxxv
 Roll of the Lords Spiritual and Temporal - Burke's Peerage, 30th edition, 1868, P xxxv
 Roll of the Lords Spiritual and Temporal - Burke's Peerage, 31st edition, 1869, P xxxv
 Roll of the Lords Spiritual and Temporal - Parliamentary Debates, 1873
 Roll of the Lords Spiritual and Temporal - Parliamentary Debates, 1892
 Roll of the Lords Spiritual and Temporal - Parliamentary Debates, 1893
 Roll of the Lords Spiritual and Temporal - Parliamentary Debates, 1899
 Roll of the Lords Spiritual and Temporal - Parliamentary Debates, 1900
 Roll of the Lords Spiritual and Temporal - Parliamentary Debates, 1922
 Roll of the Lords Spiritual and Temporal - Sessional Papers, 1933
 Roll of the Lords Spiritual and Temporal - Sessional Papers, 1953
 Roll of the Lords Spiritual and Temporal - Parliamentary Debates, 5th Series, Volume CCLXXIV, 1966-7, page xxix

British honours system
Peerages in the United Kingdom